Goodwick is the name of an electoral ward in Pembrokeshire, Wales, covering the town of the same name (part of the community of Fishguard and Goodwick). The ward elects a councillor to Pembrokeshire County Council. Six councillors are elected to the Fishguard and Goodwick Town Council.

According to the 2011 UK Census the population of the ward was 1,988 (with 1,574 of voting age).

History
In May 2017 sitting county councillor Gwilym Price lost to an Independent candidate Kevin Doolin.

At the May 2012 election, Plaid Cymru county councillor Moira Lewis lost her seat to the Welsh Labour candidate, describing the contest as "vicious".

References

Pembrokeshire electoral wards
Goodwick